Irvin Joel Vigo Guzmán (born November 24, 1984) is a Dominican professional baseball player. He played in Major League Baseball (MLB) for the Los Angeles Dodgers and Tampa Bay Devil Rays and in Nippon Professional Baseball (NPB) for the Chunichi Dragons.

Career

Los Angeles Dodgers
Guzmán signed with the Los Angeles Dodgers as an international free agent on July 2, 2001. He was signed for $2.25 million, a franchise record signing bonus. Guzmán worked his way through the minor leagues, becoming a top prospect. He was named the Dodgers Minor League Player of the Year in 2004 and was elected to the Florida State League All-Star Game. In 2005, he was named a Southern League All-Star, and ranked the fifth-best overall prospect by Baseball America. Guzmán also played in the All-Star Futures Game twice, in 2004 and 2006. With a jump to the Major League level predicted for the 2006 season, Dodgers manager Grady Little converted Guzmán to left field during spring training. With Rafael Furcal, César Izturis, and Oscar Robles already playing shortstops on the Dodgers major league roster, the position change was made in an attempt to give Guzmán increased opportunity to play with the Dodgers in 2006. He made his major league debut on June 1 of that year, as a defensive replacement in the eighth inning of a game against the Philadelphia Phillies. Guzmán grounded into a double play in his first at-bat in the bottom half of the inning.

Tampa Bay Rays
Guzmán was traded on July 31, 2006, to the Tampa Bay Devil Rays with Sergio Pedroza for Julio Lugo. He spent most of the 2007 season with the Triple-A Durham Bulls, but made his Devil Rays debut on August 19 against the Cleveland Indians. Guzmán recorded his first major league hit, a walk-off single off of Rafael Pérez, that day.

Minor league journeyman
He became a free agent at the end of the season and signed a minor league deal with the Washington Nationals on December 13, 2008. On February 4, 2010, the Baltimore Orioles signed Guzmán to a minor league deal, and he completed the 2010 season at the AA level playing for the Bowie Baysox. In December 2010 it was announced that he signed a deal to play in Japan for the Chunichi Dragons in 2011. He signed a minor league contract with the Cincinnati Reds for the 2012 season, and was released in June. 

Guzmán played in the Mexican League in 2012 and 2013 and after not playing in 2014, he signed with the Camden Riversharks of the Atlantic League of Professional Baseball for 2015.

Guzmán signed with the York Revolution of the Atlantic League of Professional Baseball for the 2016 season.  He was released from the York Revolution on June 11, 2017.

References

External links

1984 births
Living people
Bowie Baysox players
Camden Riversharks players
Chunichi Dragons players
Dominican Republic expatriate baseball players in Japan
Dominican Republic expatriate baseball players in Mexico
Dominican Republic expatriate baseball players in the United States
Durham Bulls players
Estrellas Orientales players
Great Falls Dodgers players
Gulf Coast Dodgers players
Harrisburg Senators players
Jacksonville Suns players
Las Vegas 51s players

Leones del Escogido players
Los Angeles Dodgers players
Major League Baseball players from the Dominican Republic
Major League Baseball third basemen
Mexican League baseball first basemen
Mexican League baseball right fielders
Nippon Professional Baseball first basemen
Nippon Professional Baseball right fielders
Olmecas de Tabasco players
Pensacola Blue Wahoos players
Saraperos de Saltillo players
South Georgia Waves players
Syracuse Chiefs players
Sugar Land Skeeters players
Tampa Bay Devil Rays players
Vaqueros Laguna players
Vero Beach Dodgers players
York Revolution players